Rui Alberto Faria da Costa, ComIH (born 5 October 1986) is a Portuguese professional road bicycle racer, who rides for UCI WorldTeam . He is best known for winning the 2013 UCI Road World Championships in Tuscany, Italy (the first Portuguese rider to do so), three stages of the Tour de France in 2011 and 2013, and the 2012, 2013 and 2014 editions of the Tour de Suisse, becoming the first cyclist to win the event for three consecutive years.

Early life and amateur career
Born in Aguçadoura, Póvoa de Varzim, Costa started his career at Guilhabreu, a civil parish of Vila do Conde, then went to Santa Maria da Feira.

Professional career

2007–10: Early years
In 2009, Costa won the Four Days of Dunkirk followed by a win on stage 8 of the 2010 Tour de Suisse.

In 2010, Costa was involved with an altercation with Carlos Barredo at the end of Stage 6 of the Tour de France, with Barredo removing his front wheel and attempting to club Costa with it before both riders lobbed blows at each other. Both were fined 300 francs for the incident.

At the Portuguese national championships in June 2010 Costa and his brother Mário tested positive for the banned substance methylhexanamine, which they claimed to have ingested inadvertently due to a tainted food supplement.

2011

In 2011, Costa performed well in the Vuelta a la Comunidad de Madrid: after second places in the first and third stages, he won the overall classification. Later that season, Costa rode away solo to win stage 8 of the Tour de France. Following his previous successes, Costa won the Grand Prix Cycliste de Montréal, sprinting away from a late breakaway, beating breakaway companion Pierrick Fédrigo. Both were chased by Philippe Gilbert, who made a late counter-attack, but came two seconds short.

2012

In 2012, Costa finished third in the General classification of the Tour de Romandie. He won stage 2 in the Tour de Suisse, took the race's lead and successfully defended the yellow jersey through the Tour. He hung on to his 14 seconds overall lead over second-placed Fränk Schleck in the last stage, where Schleck attacked on the slopes of the Glaubenberg Pass. Schleck crested the climb with an advantage of a minute over Costa, but was reeled back in along the descent by the small group containing Costa. The pair finished the stage with the same time. He said after the important win: "I want to dedicate this to the team, because my teammates worked magnificently all week. I have no words to describe it." Costa headed to the Tour de France, slated to ride in support of his leader Alejandro Valverde, but crashes and incidents plagued Valverde, who still managed to grab a stage win and finished 20th overall. Costa placed higher than his captain in the general classification at 18th. He then participated in the GP Ouest-France, where he settled for second place of the French classic. In September, he headed to the Canadian province of Quebec to take part in the two World Tour races held there. He took the third step of the podium in the Grand Prix Cycliste de Québec, winning the sprint of a group of 16 riders in hot pursuit of the two escapees, Simon Gerrans and Greg Van Avermaet, who finished four seconds ahead of Costa. Two days later, he aimed at defending his title in the Grand Prix Cycliste de Montréal, but finished eighth, once again with a 4-second deficit over the winner, Lars Petter Nordhaug. He concluded his season in China at the Tour of Beijing, scoring another top ten overall placing with ninth.

2013
In 2013, Costa started the year by winning the Klasika Primavera and finishing third in the Tour de Romandie and also aimed to defend his Tour de Suisse title. He later successfully defended his title after winning stage seven, and then taking the yellow jersey from Mathias Frank after winning the final stage, a hill climb time trial. In the Tour de France, Costa left the Pyrenees inside the top ten. On stage 13, Costa lost close to ten minutes after going back to try to help his team leader, Valverde, who suffered a puncture. On stage 16, Costa ended up on a breakaway where he attacked on the last climb of the day, the Col de Manse before the final downhill to a solo finish in Gap. He was also awarded the combativity prize of that stage. A few days later, Costa won stage 19 after escaping from the lead group on the Col de la Croix Fry, he ended up with another solo finish in Le Grand-Bornand.

Costa won the elite men's race at the UCI Road World Championships in Tuscany, Italy, becoming the first Portuguese rider to wear the rainbow jersey. After the race Costa said: "After the Tour, the goal was to reach the World Cup in the best possible conditions and make a good race. But I never thought I could win a race as important as this. It means everything to me. It is the reward for a lifetime of effort and hard work."

2014–22: Lampre–Merida

2014

Costa started the 2014 season by taking third place and the points classification jersey in the Volta ao Algarve. He then finished second overall in Paris–Nice and, for the third consecutive year, claimed the third place in the Tour de Romandie. Costa's first win of the season in the world champion's rainbow jersey occurred in the last stage of the Tour de Suisse. With this victory Costa took the yellow jersey from Tony Martin and successfully defended his title, thus becoming the first cyclist to win Tour de Suisse three consecutive times.

Costa entered the Tour de France with high hopes, aiming for a podium finish, but started to lose touch with the front riders due to bronchitis. During the second rest day, his health condition worsened and he was diagnosed with bronchopneumonia. Ranked 13th in the general classification, Costa was forced to withdraw from the Tour. He returned to UCI World Tour competition at the GP Ouest-France, crossing the finish line in 92nd place, 11 seconds behind winner Sylvain Chavanel. Costa then competed in the Grand Prix Cycliste de Québec and the Grand Prix Cycliste de Montréal, securing a runner-up place in the latter race, behind Simon Gerrans.

Costa went to the UCI Road World Championships in Ponferrada, Spain, with the aim of defending his road race title; he finished in 23rd place, seven seconds behind the winner and his successor, Michał Kwiatkowski of Poland.

2015
Costa took the fourth place in the general classification of Paris–Nice as a first notable result, thanks in part to a third place on the time trial up Col d'Èze. He finished seventh in the mountainous World Tour race, the Tour of the Basque Country. He also grabbed the fourth place in the Amstel Gold Race, where Michał Kwiatkowski imposed himself; a week later he would come again in fourth place at Liège–Bastogne–Liège. He decided not to go defend his title at the Tour de Suisse, which he had won three times in a row, and participated in the concurrent Critérium du Dauphiné instead. Costa won the sixth stage of the race after being in the breakaway for most of the day, passing Vincenzo Nibali near the finish line. A week before the Tour de France, Costa won the Portuguese National Road Race Championships. At the Tour de France he retired due to injuries picked up in a crash, leading him to announce he would ride for stage wins in the future.

2017
He was named in the start list for the 2017 Giro d'Italia.

Career achievements

Major results
Source: 

2007
 1st  Overall Giro delle Regioni
2008
 2nd Overall Giro delle Regioni
1st Stage 4
 2nd Overall Coupe des nations Ville Saguenay
1st Stage 4 (ITT)
 2nd Overall Tour de l'Avenir
 UCI Under-23 Road World Championships
5th Road race
8th Time trial
 5th Overall Clásica Internacional de Alcobendas
2009
 1st  Overall Four Days of Dunkirk
1st  Young rider classification
 2nd Road race, National Road Championships
 3rd Overall Vuelta a Chihuahua
1st  Mountains classification
1st Stage 3
2010
 1st  Time trial, National Road Championships
 1st Trofeo Deià
 1st Stage 8 Tour de Suisse
 2nd Overall Four Days of Dunkirk
1st  Young rider classification
 6th Overall Volta ao Algarve
2011
 1st  Overall Vuelta a la Comunidad de Madrid
1st  Points classification
 1st Grand Prix Cycliste de Montréal
 1st Stage 8 Tour de France
 4th Overall Circuit de Lorraine
2012
 1st  Overall Tour de Suisse
1st Stage 2
 2nd GP Ouest–France
 2nd Trofeo Deià
 3rd Overall Tour de Romandie
 3rd Grand Prix Cycliste de Québec
 4th GP Miguel Induráin
 5th Overall Volta ao Algarve
 7th Overall Tour du Poitou-Charentes
 8th Grand Prix Cycliste de Montréal
 9th Overall Tour of Beijing
 10th UCI World Tour
2013
 1st  Road race, UCI Road World Championships
 1st  Time trial, National Road Championships
 1st  Overall Tour de Suisse
1st Stages 7 & 9 (ITT)
 1st Klasika Primavera
 Tour de France
1st Stages 16 & 19
 Combativity award Stage 16
 3rd Overall Tour de Romandie
 4th Overall Tour of Beijing
 4th Trofeo Serra de Tramuntana
 5th Overall Volta ao Algarve
 5th Grand Prix Cycliste de Québec
 6th Grand Prix Cycliste de Montréal
 9th UCI World Tour
 9th Liège–Bastogne–Liège
2014
 1st  Overall Tour de Suisse
1st Stage 9
 2nd Time trial, National Road Championships
 2nd Overall Paris–Nice
 2nd Grand Prix Cycliste de Montréal
 3rd Overall Volta ao Algarve
1st  Points classification
 3rd Overall Tour de Romandie
 3rd Giro di Lombardia
 4th UCI World Tour
 4th Overall Tour of Beijing
2015
 1st  Road race, National Road Championships
 3rd Overall Critérium du Dauphiné
1st Stage 6
 3rd Grand Prix Cycliste de Montréal
 4th Overall Paris–Nice
 4th Amstel Gold Race
 4th Liège–Bastogne–Liège
 7th Overall Tour of the Basque Country
 9th UCI World Tour
 9th Road race, UCI Road World Championships
2016
 3rd Liège–Bastogne–Liège
 5th Overall Tour of Oman
 6th Road race, UEC European Road Championships
 6th Overall Tour de Romandie
 7th Overall Tour of the Basque Country
 7th Overall Tour de Suisse
 10th Road race, Olympic Games
 10th Overall Paris–Nice
 10th La Flèche Wallonne
  Combativity award Stage 19 Tour de France
2017
 1st  Overall Abu Dhabi Tour
1st Stage 3
 2nd Overall Tour of Oman
 5th Overall Vuelta a San Juan
1st Stage 5
 5th Overall Tour de Suisse
 10th Overall Tour de Pologne
2018
 5th Overall Tour de Romandie
 6th Grand Prix Cycliste de Montréal
 8th Overall Abu Dhabi Tour
 10th Road race, UCI Road World Championships
 10th Overall Tour of Oman
2019
 2nd Overall Tour de Romandie
 4th Overall Tour of Oman
 7th Grand Prix Cycliste de Montréal
 10th Road race, UCI Road World Championships
 10th Overall Tirreno–Adriatico
 10th Overall Volta a la Comunitat Valenciana
 10th Overall Vuelta a Burgos
2020
 National Road Championships
1st  Road race
2nd Time trial
 3rd Overall Saudi Tour
1st Stage 1
 3rd Overall Tour du Limousin
 4th Overall Volta ao Algarve
 10th Overall Tour de Pologne
2021
 2nd Grand Prix of Aargau Canton
 7th Overall Tour de Suisse
2022
 3rd Overall Tour of Oman
 3rd Overall Saudi Tour
 10th Overall Tour du Limousin
2023
 1st  Overall Volta a la Comunitat Valenciana
1st Stage 5
 1st Trofeo Calvià
 2nd La Drôme Classic
 4th Strade Bianche
 4th Figueira Champions Classic
 9th Classic Sud-Ardèche
 10th Overall Volta ao Algarve

General classification results timeline

Classics results timeline

Major championships timeline

Awards
 Portuguese Sportsman of the Year: 2012, 2013, 2014

References

External links

 
 
 
 
 
 
 
 

1986 births
Living people
Portuguese male cyclists
Portuguese expatriate cyclists
Portuguese Tour de France stage winners
People from Póvoa de Varzim
Tour de Suisse stage winners
Cyclists at the 2012 Summer Olympics
Cyclists at the 2016 Summer Olympics
Olympic cyclists of Portugal
UCI Road World Champions (elite men)
2013 Tour de France stage winners
2011 Tour de France stage winners
Sportspeople from Porto District